Bauduen is a rural commune in the Var department in the Provence-Alpes-Côte d'Azur region in Southeastern France. In 2019, it had a population of 321.

See also
 Communes of the Var department
 Lac de Sainte-Croix

References

Communes of Var (department)